The U-101 class was a class of nine submarines or U-boats planned for the Austro-Hungarian Navy ( or ) during World War I. The class was based on the Type 1916 S 1 design from Ungarische Unterseebotsbau AG. The first three boats were laid down in late 1917 and early 1918 by Austriawerft in Trieste, but none were launched or completed before the end of the war. None of the other six submarines was ever laid down.

Design 
Austria-Hungary's U-boat fleet was largely obsolete at the outbreak of World War I, and over the first two years of the war the Austro-Hungarian Navy focused its efforts on building a U-boat fleet for local defense within the Adriatic. Beginning in 1916, the Navy began building larger, ocean-going vessels for operation in the wider Mediterranean, outside the Adriatic. With six of the larger submarines under construction, the Navy considered either building German Type UB III submarines under license or implementing the Type 1916 S 1 design submitted by Ungarische Unterseebotsbau AG (UBAG) of Fiume.

The U-101 class was based on the UBAG design, which called for a boat that displaced  surfaced and  submerged. The U-101 class boats were designed for a crew of 26 men.

The U-101 design called for five  torpedo tubes—four bow tubes and one stern tube—and a complement of nine torpedoes. The original design specified a single 10 cm/35 (3.9 in) deck gun supplemented with an  machine gun.

Construction 
The Austro-Hungarian Navy authorized a total of nine U-101-class submarines, six numbered sequentially from U-101 to U-106, and another three, U-118 to U-120. Upon completion of the first six U-101 boats, the Navy intended to scrap its oldest six boats, U-1 to U-6, and drop the first two digits from the new boats so that, for example, U-101 would become the new U-1. In late 1917 and early 1918 the first three boats, U-101 to U-103, were laid down by Austriawerft at Trieste.

The boats were begun late in the war when shortages of skilled shipyard workers and materials were slowing construction of other boats under construction. As a result, none of the first three boats was ever launched, much less completed, and the rest were cancelled before any were laid down. U-101 was 47% complete at war's end, while U-102 and U-103 were only 30% and 10% complete, respectively. Although there is no specific mention of the fates of the three incomplete boats of the U-101 class, incomplete boats from other late-war classes were scrapped in 1919 and 1920.

Notes

References

Bibliography 

 
 

Submarine classes
Submarines of the Austro-Hungarian Navy